

Samson Slaying a Philistine is a marble sculpture by Giambologna, executed c. 1562, the earliest of his great marble groups of the sculptor to the Medici Grand Dukes of Tuscany, and the only substantial work by the artist to have left Italy. It was commissioned in about 1562, by Francesco de' Medici for a fountain in Florence, but was later sent as a gift to Spain being placed in Palacio de la Ribera, Valladolid. The group was presented to the Prince of Wales, later King Charles I, in 1623 while he was in Spain negotiating a marriage contract, and it soon became the most famous Italian sculpture in England. On its arrival in England it was given to the king's favourite, the Duke of Buckingham, and subsequently changed hands three times before coming to the Victoria and Albert Museum in 1954.

The sculpture shows Samson wielding the jawbone of an ass in order to slay one of the Philistines who have taunted him. It is a good example of the multiple viewpoints seen in Giambologna's work; the spiralling movement of the bodies means that there is no main view. The dramatic pose is based on a composition by Michelangelo, who was in his late seventies when Giambologna met him in Rome. The group was carved from just one block of marble, supported by only five narrow points. Although the marble is weathered from three centuries outdoors, it still shows Giambologna's sensitive carving.

See also
 Palacio de la Ribera

References
V&A collections database

Bibliography

External links
 

Sculptures of the Victoria and Albert Museum
1560s sculptures
Samson
Sculptures by Giambologna
Sculptures depicting Hebrew Bible people